Lie-in may refer to

 Die-in, a form of protest
 Duvet day, an unplanned day off work

See also
 Lie in Our Graves
 Lie in state